Orlando Ferguson (November 6, 1846 – February 3, 1911) was a South Dakota resident best known today for a detailed flat earth map he created in 1893.

Biography

Ferguson was born near Du Quoin, Illinois in 1846. He married in 1872 and moved to the Dakota Territory in the early 1880s, finally settling in Hot Springs, South Dakota in 1886. There, he ran a grocery store for a few years, and later built a hotel. After the hotel was lost in a fire, he built a bath house around the Siloam Springs.  While often referred to as "doctor", Ferguson was not a formal medical doctor or trained as such. The name came from the sick who visited the bath house.

Ferguson died in Hot Springs in February 1911.

Flat earth map
In 2011, Ferguson was the subject of press attention after a copy of his 1893 flat earth map was donated to and accepted by the Library of Congress. The Fall River Pioneer Museum in Hot Springs also retains a slightly-incomplete copy.

More specifically, his map depicts a "square and stationary" Earth, based on his literal interpretation of the Bible, which references angels visiting the "four corners" of the world. He lectured in Hot Springs on his ideas in 1891, followed up by a 60-page pamphlet full of related hypotheses. For instance, Ferguson also asserted that the Sun was 30 miles in diameter and 3,000 miles away from Earth. He also disputed the existence of gravity. However, he was largely forgotten until the 2011 donation. Ferguson also published a magazine in 1896 called "Square World."

References

External links
 Map of the square and stationary earth at the Library of Congress

1846 births
1911 deaths
People from Hot Springs, South Dakota
Flat Earth proponents
People from Du Quoin, Illinois